John C. Depp, II v. Amber Laura Heard was a trial held in Fairfax County, Virginia, from April 11 to June 1, 2022, that ruled on allegations of defamation between formerly married American actors Johnny Depp and Amber Heard. Depp, as plaintiff, filed a complaint of defamation against defendant Heard claiming $50 million in damages; Heard filed counterclaims against Depp claiming $100 million in damages.

After first meeting in 2009, Depp and Heard married in February 2015. In May 2016, at an early stage in their divorce proceedings, Heard claimed that Depp had abused her physically, which he denied. In a separate libel trial in England, in which Depp sued News Group Newspapers Ltd over an article published in The Sun, the presiding judge ruled against Depp, stating that "the great majority of alleged assaults of Ms Heard by Mr Depp have been proved to the civil standard." Several legal experts suggested that Depp had a smaller chance of winning in the US trial compared to the UK trial.

In the Virginia trial, Depp's claims related to a December 2018 op-ed by Heard, published in The Washington Post. Depp claimed Heard caused new damage to his reputation and career by stating that she had spoken up against "sexual violence" and that "two years ago, [she] became a public figure representing domestic abuse." Heard's counterclaims included allegations that Adam Waldman, Depp's former lawyer, had defamed her in statements published in the Daily Mail in 2020. Throughout the trial, Depp's legal team sought to disprove Heard's abuse allegations and to demonstrate that she had been the instigator, rather than the victim, of intimate partner violence. Heard's lawyers defended the op-ed, claiming it to be factual and protected by the First Amendment.

The livestreamed trial attracted large numbers of viewers and considerable social media response, the majority of which was sympathetic to Depp and critical of Heard. News articles about the case generated high levels of social media interaction and renewed debates around topics relating to domestic violence, the #MeToo movement, and women's rights.

The jury ruled that Heard's op-ed references to "sexual violence" and "domestic abuse" were false and defamed Depp with actual malice and awarded Depp $10 million in compensatory damages and $5 million in punitive damages from Heard, although the court reduced the punitive damages to $350,000 due to a limit imposed by Virginia state law. They also ruled that Waldman had defamed Heard by falsely alleging that she and her friends "roughed up" Depp's penthouse as part of a "hoax." They awarded Heard $2 million in compensatory damages and $0 in punitive damages from Depp. Separately, the jury ruled that Waldman's other allegations of Heard's "sexual violence hoax" and "abuse hoax" against Depp had not been proven defamatory.

After the trial ended, Heard put forth motions to set aside the verdict, but was unsuccessful. Then, both Depp and Heard appealed against the respective verdicts. In December 2022, both parties reached a settlement and dropped their appeals, with Depp's lawyers stating that Depp would receive $1 million from Heard.

Background

Depp and Heard's relationship

Actors Johnny Depp and Amber Heard met in 2009 while filming The Rum Diary; according to Heard, their relationship began "around the end of 2011 or early 2012". They got engaged in January 2014 and married on Depp’s private island in the Bahamas, Little Hall's Pond Cay, in February 2015. Heard filed for divorce on May 23, 2016, and obtained a temporary restraining order against Depp. In response, he alleged that she was "attempting to secure a premature financial resolution by alleging abuse". Heard testified about the alleged abuse in a deposition during their divorce litigation, alleging that Depp had been "verbally and physically abusive" throughout their relationship, usually while under the influence of alcohol or drugs. The divorce received much publicity, with images of Heard's alleged injuries published by the media.

A settlement was reached in August 2016, and the divorce was finalized in January 2017. Heard withdrew the restraining order, and she and Depp released a joint statement stating that their relationship was "intensely passionate and periodically volatile, but always bound by love. Neither party has made false accusations for financial gain. There was never any intent of physical or emotional harm."

Depp paid Heard a divorce settlement of $7 million, which she pledged to donate to the American Civil Liberties Union and the Children's Hospital Los Angeles. The settlement included a non-disclosure agreement (NDA) preventing either party from discussing their relationship publicly.

Depp v News Group Newspapers Ltd

In April 2018, UK tabloid The Sun published an article with an online title that described Depp as a "wife beater" and, in June 2018, Depp sued News Group Newspapers, the publisher of The Sun, and then executive editor Dan Wootton for libel. Both Depp and Heard testified in the July 2020 trial, which focused on evaluating 14 alleged incidents of abuse.  November 2020, judge Andrew Nicol ruled in favor of the publisher as the great majority of Depp's alleged assaults had been proven to a civil standard and were found to be "substantially true". The verdict found that Depp had assaulted Heard in 12 of the 14 alleged incidents and put her in fear of her life. Mr Justice Nicol had rejected Depp’s contention that Heard was a “gold-digger”, saying in his ruling: “Her donation of the seven million US dollars to charity is hardly the act one would expect of a gold-digger.” Heard later testified in the 2022 Virginia trial that she hadn't in fact donated all the pledged $7 million divorce settlement to charity as of yet.

After the verdict, Depp resigned from the Fantastic Beasts film series at the request of Warner Bros., its production company. In March 2021, the Court of Appeal rejected Depp's request to appeal the verdict, concluding that the appeal had "no real prospect of success". Lawyers for Depp had argued that he had not received a fair hearing, that Heard was an unreliable witness and that recently discovered evidence contradicts Heard's assertion about her donation of the divorce settlement sum, arguing that the Judge in deciding the case, gave great weight to Heard's testimony that she donated all her $7 million divorce settlement to charity. But the appeals judges concluded he had a "full and fair" trial, and that "the judge based his conclusions on each of the incidents on his extremely detailed review of the evidence specific to each incident [...] in an approach of that kind there was little need or room for the judge to give weight to any general assessment of Ms. Heard's credibility."

Heard's op-ed in The Washington Post
In December 2018, The Washington Post published an op-ed written by Heard and titled "Amber Heard: I spoke up against sexual violence—and faced our culture's wrath. That has to change." In the article, Heard stated: "Then two years ago, I became a public figure representing domestic abuse, and I felt the full force of our culture's wrath for women who speak out. ... I had the rare vantage point of seeing, in real time, how institutions protect men accused of abuse." She further stated that, as a result of this, she had lost a film role and an advertising campaign for a global fashion brand. The op-ed called for Congress to re-authorize the Violence Against Women Act and did not explicitly mention Depp by name.

Waldman's comments in the Daily Mail
Matters from Heard's counterclaims pursued through the trial related to three statements made by Depp's lawyer, Adam Waldman, and published by the Daily Mail in April and June 2020.

First, Waldman stated that "Amber Heard and her friends in the media used fake sexual violence allegations as both sword and shield, depending on their needs. They have selected some of her sexual violence hoax 'facts' as the sword, inflicting them on the public and Mr. Depp."

Waldman's second statement regarded a 2016 incident in Depp and Heard's Hollywood penthouse: "Quite simply this was an ambush, a hoax. They set Mr. Depp up by calling the cops but the first attempt didn't do the trick. The officers came to the penthouses, thoroughly searched and interviewed, and left after seeing no damage to face or property. So, Amber and her friends spilled a little wine and roughed the place up, got their stories straight under the direction of a lawyer and publicist, and then placed a second call to 911."

Third, Waldman stated: "We have reached the beginning of the end of Ms. Heard's abuse hoax against Johnny Depp."

Trial 
In February 2019, Depp sued Heard over her December 2018 op-ed in The Washington Post. Depp claimed that Heard's allegations were part of an elaborate hoax against him and repeated his allegation that Heard had been the one who violently abused him. In August 2020, Heard countersued Depp, including the allegation that he had coordinated "a harassment campaign via Twitter and orchestrated online petitions in an effort to get her fired from Aquaman and L'Oréal." The trial was held at the Fairfax County Circuit Court. The location was chosen on the basis that the online edition and the print edition of The Washington Post op-ed are published in the county.

Pre-trial developments 
In June 2020, lawyers who withdrew from Heard's legal team included the Time's Up founder, Roberta Kaplan. In October 2020, the judge ruling on early pre-trial motions revoked permission for lawyer Adam Waldman to represent Depp in Virginia after Waldman leaked confidential information covered by a protective order to the media. In August 2021, a New York judge ruled that the American Civil Liberties Union (ACLU) had to disclose documents related to Heard's charity pledge to the organization for which the ACLU would later demand payment. Also in August 2021, Judge Penney S. Azcarate overruled a plea filed by Heard's lawyers for having the defamation suit dismissed on the basis of the verdict in Depp's lawsuit against the publishers of The Sun, with Azcarate citing that: Heard had been a witness in the UK case (as opposed to a defendant), the facts alleged were different (Heard's allegedly defamatory statements were made after the English case commenced), and the parties had not been subject to the same discovery procedures as in the United States. In February 2022, Azcarate ordered to permit the broadcast of courtroom proceedings.

Jury selection 

On April 11, 2022, the trial began in Fairfax County, Virginia with a day to finalize jury selection.

Opening statements 
Opening statements were made on April 12, 2022. Lawyers representing Depp accused Heard of fabricating domestic abuse accusations against Depp to further her career, saying that Heard made such allegations because Depp had asked for a divorce, and they further accused Heard of being the actual abuser in the relationship. They argued that, while Heard's 2018 op-ed did not mention Depp, it was clear by implication that it referred to him, and that Heard's writing in the piece ("Then two years ago, I became a public figure representing domestic abuse") was a reference to her May 2016 restraining order request, in which she alleged that Depp had physically abused her. Depp's lawyers discussed Heard appearing in public with a bruised face on May 27, 2016, accusing her of staging the injury, citing that Depp had not met her since May 21, 2016, and that his witnesses has seen her without the injury in the days between May 21, 2016 and May 27, 2016. They also discussed several instances in which Depp alleges Heard instigated physical violence against him.

Heard's lawyers claimed that Depp had physically and sexually abused Heard on multiple occasions throughout their relationship, usually triggered by his addiction to both alcohol and drugs. They accused Depp of seeking to "humiliate [Heard], haunt her, wreck her career" with the Virginia lawsuit and to turn the case into a "soap opera". They further argued that the First Amendment protected Heard's right to express her views in the op-ed, which was mostly focused on a broad discussion of domestic violence and did not explicitly mention Depp's name. Finally, Heard's lawyers stated that the allegations had not changed Depp's reputation, as they had become public knowledge two years prior to the op-ed, and that Depp had instead ruined his Hollywood career himself with his drinking and drug use; this made him "unreliable" in the eyes of major film studios.

Testimony 
Witness lists were submitted by both parties, prior to trial.

Witness testimony began on April 12, following the parties' presentation of their opening statements, and ended on May 26.

Closing arguments 
Following the judge's reading of the trial's jury instructions on May 27, 2022, Depp's and Heard's legal teams presented their closing arguments.

Depp's legal team maintained that Heard was the abuser in their relationship and that Heard's allegations against Depp were untrue and had ruined his life. They asked the jurors to "give him his life back". "You either believe all of it or none of it. Either Mr. Depp assaulted Ms. Heard with a bottle in Australia, or Ms. Heard got up on that stand, in front of all of you, and made up that horrific tale of abuse," lawyer Camille Vasquez told the jury. "An act of profound cruelty not just to Mr. Depp but to true survivors of domestic abuse." Vasquez told the court that Heard "came into this courtroom ready to give the performance of her lifetime ... and she gave it." Vasquez also argued that Heard "burns bridges" and "her close friends don't show up for her," because, according to Vasquez, apart from Heard's sister, every person who personally testified on behalf of Heard was a "paid expert", whereas many witnesses personally testified for Depp in court.

Heard's legal team maintained that Depp did abuse Heard, and that even if he did not abuse her, the op-ed was not libelous as it did not mention Depp by name nor directly address her allegations against him. They told jurors to "think about the message that Mr. Depp and his attorneys are sending to Amber and victims of domestic abuse." "If you didn't take pictures, it didn't happen," Benjamin Rottenborn, a lawyer for Heard, said. "If you didn't seek medical attention, you weren't injured." He claimed Depp "cannot and will not take responsibility. [...] It's all somebody else's fault." He told jurors that "if Amber was abused by Mr. Depp even one time, then she wins." Rottenborn accused Depp of "victim blaming at its most disgusting".

Verdict 
On June 1, 2022, after nearly two days of deliberations, the jury found that Depp had proven all the elements of defamation for all three statements from Heard's 2018 op-ed, including that the statements were false, and that Heard defamed Depp with actual malice. The jury awarded Depp $10 million in compensatory damages and $5 million in punitive damages from Heard. The punitive damages, however, were reduced to $350,000 due to a limit imposed by Virginia state law.

In regard to Heard's counterclaim, the jury found the second of the three contested statements that Depp's former lawyer Adam Waldman had published in the Daily Mail to be defamatory and false, defaming Heard with actual malice. Regarding the other two contested statements, the jurors concluded that Heard's attorneys had not proven all the elements of defamation. Heard was awarded $2 million in compensatory damages from Depp but no punitive damages.

Reactions
The trial drew much attention from supporters of both Depp and Heard as well as the general public. At the start of the trial, several legal experts suggested that Depp had a smaller chance of winning than he did in the previous UK trial, citing the strong free speech protections in the US.

Livestream

The trial was live-streamed, with very high viewing figures and video clips being widely shared on social media. The president of the Law & Crime network, Rachel Stockman, observed that the average daily viewership on their app was 50x higher than before the trial. 

The decision by Judge Azcarate to allow livestreaming, a rarity in Virginia courts, has been criticized. Some observers expressed concern that it would discourage victims of domestic violence from speaking out; Michele Dauber, a professor at Stanford Law School, stated, "Allowing this trial to be televised is the single worst decision I can think of in the context of intimate partner violence and sexual violence in recent history, it has ramifications way beyond this case." 

In a pre-trial hearing, Heard’s team tried unsuccessfully to exclude the cameras, while Depp’s lawyer welcomed the cameras and stated that "Mr. Depp believes in transparency." Judge Azcarate, who worried that reporters might otherwise have come to the courthouse and potentially create hazardous conditions, had said, "I don’t see any good cause not to do it."

Social media coverage
Data collected by Newswhip from April 4 to May 16, 2022, indicated that news articles about the trial had generated more social media interactions per article in the United States than all other significant news topics, including the leaked Supreme Court draft opinion on abortion, Elon Musk's acquisition of Twitter,  the inflation surge and the 2022 Russian invasion of Ukraine. Twitter, TikTok, and Instagram users expressed opinions about the case or rallied against others doing the same. Clips of the trial were used to create memes, compilation or reaction videos, with multiple such videos going viral. Those posting about the trial on social media were seen to mostly support Depp and oppose Heard. Videos carrying the hashtag #justiceforjohnnydepp had attained over 18 billion views on TikTok by the trial's conclusion. BuzzFeed News reported that, between April 25 and 29, 2022, there were 1,667 posts uploaded to Facebook using the hashtag #JusticeForJohnnyDepp, with over 7 million total interactions, i.e., likes and shares between them. In comparison, Heard only had 16 posts in support, with 10,415 interactions. Additionally, on TikTok, videos tagged with #JusticeForAmberHeard had over 21 million combined views, while videos tagged with #JusticeForJohnnyDepp had over 5 billion combined views as of April 29.

Journalist Amelia Tait of The Guardian said that Heard v. Depp had turned into "trial by TikTok", stating that the case had become "a source of comedy" on social media. Similar themes were noted by journalists at BuzzFeed News, The Independent, and Vanity Fair.
Amanda Hess, a critic writing for The New York Times, opined that the broadcasting of the trial "is an invitation for the proceedings to be deliberately, even gleefully tailored to a viewer's whim", with internet platforms like TikTok and YouTube being "practically built to manipulate raw visual materials in the service of a personality cult, harassment campaign or branding opportunity." Bill Goodykoontz of The Arizona Republic criticized the coverage of the trial on social media, stating that "Depp and Heard are real people with real problems, after all, not just meme fodder and hashtag subjects," and that "the vile nature of some of the misogynistic tweets and TikTok videos posted about Heard were toxic masculinity at its worst." Katherine Denkinson of The Independent compared the backlash on social media against Heard and her supporters during the trial with Gamergate, claiming that "the anti-Amber train has been expertly commandeered by the alt-right." Sunny Hundal of The Independent, commenting about positive online content about Depp and negative online content about Heard, opined that even as Depp "continued to entertain people during the trial", "being an entertainer doesn't automatically mean you're a good person. And yet many simply cannot get their head around this idea."

Misinformation 
Misinformation was widely shared, with researchers identifying bots artificially spreading content. Shannon Keating, a culture writer and editor for BuzzFeed News, wrote that the "social media frenzy around this case was clearly fueled by savvy PR", bots, and conservative media advertising, with the result that "lots of people have happily accepted the propaganda as sacrosanct." In May 2022, the media non-profit The Citizens and Vice World News reported that the conservative website The Daily Wire had spent between $35,000 and $47,000 on Facebook and Instagram advertisements and have promoted "misleading information about the trial" and "anti-Amber Heard propaganda".

The intense coverage of the trial and the fact that it was live-streamed made it an unusual case. Legal commentators criticized the fact that jury members in the trial were not sequestered and believe that the social media coverage may have had an influence on the final verdict. During the trial, the judge asked the jurors to refrain from reading about the case online, even instructing them to turn off their cell phones for its duration. Paula Todd, a lawyer and media professor, raised the question of how many of the jury members would listen to the judge's instructions to avoid accessing online coverage. Law professor Mary Anne Franks claimed that she encountered out-of-context, distorted depictions of the trial despite trying to avoid reading about it and stated that "it's crazy to think they are not going to be influenced by what's happening on social media." Carl Tobias, a University of Richmond law professor, stated that "It wasn't a typical trial" and that he "was pretty surprised about the verdict". He also stated "I don't envy the judge—or the jurors—because it's hard to protect them from these influences" and stated that this case could have an effect on the role of juries and a person's right to a fair trial.

Comments by juror

Following the trial, a male juror was interviewed by Good Morning America. He stated that "Social media did not impact us": "We followed the evidence. We didn't take into account anything outside ... They were very serious accusations and a lot of money involved. So we weren't taking it lightly." The juror also said that no one on the jury was starstruck, stating "none of us were really fans of either one of them." Depp and Heard "were both abusive to each other" but that Heard's team failed to prove that Depp's abuse was physical. "They had their husband-wife arguments. They were both yelling at each other, I don't think that makes either of them right or wrong ... But to rise to the level of what she was claiming, there wasn’t enough or any evidence that really supported what she was saying". The juror opined that Heard's testimony was not "believable" because it "seemed like she was able to flip the switch on her emotions", while Depp "seemed a little more real in terms of how he responded to questions". Heard, the juror said, was considered the aggressor in the relationship by the majority of the jury, stating "If you have a battered wife or spouse situation, why would you buy the other person, the ‘aggressor,’ a knife?".

The Washington Post
On June 2, 2022, The Washington Post affixed an editor's note to Heard's 2018 op-ed to notify readers of the defamation suit and its outcome, reading, "On June 1, 2022, [...] a jury found Heard liable on three counts. [...] The jury separately found that Depp, through his lawyer Adam Waldman, defamed Heard in one of three counts in her countersuit."

Possible effects on defamation suits, #MeToo, and other issues 

Various columnists, legal experts, and observers on social media reacted strongly to the verdict. Legal experts considered the verdict unusual; defamation suits by public figures are rarely successful in the United States, relevant case law being New York Times Co. v. Sullivan and the subsequent Curtis Publishing Co. v. Butts. New York Times reporter Jeremy W. Peters said that, in publishing allegations of abuse, "both [...] women and the press assume the considerable risk that comes with antagonizing the rich, powerful and litigious." Psychology professor Jennifer Freyd, who coined the term DARVO (deny, attack, and reverse victim and offender), stated that "there has been a lot of Darvo" in this case, with "an overwhelming case for Depp on social media". Dan Novack of The Atlantic argued that the verdict concluded a "fair trial" and was not a markedly different interpretation of the First Amendment, which he says remains "enormously protective of media reporting on credible accusations of sexual abuse. It is telling that Depp did not name the ACLU  [...] or The Washington Post."

Columnists, including feminist writers and researchers in intimate partner violence, considered the verdict a backlash against feminism and the #MeToo movement and predicted a chilling effect on the speech of those victims of domestic violence who might fear being sued for defamation or disregarded without extensive photographic and medical evidence. Others argued that the verdict was in fact an expansion of #MeToo to male victims of intimate partner violence and a "victory in the battle against cancel culture". Some were skeptical of the trial's long-term effect, arguing that the trial's context was too unique to be indicative of #MeToo's reversal. Mitra Ahouraian, a media attorney said "I’m hoping that people recognize this as distinct from a lot of the #MeToo situations that we’ve seen, for example, like the Harvey Weinsteins of the world, This is not that. This is two people who were in a toxic relationship that were awful to one another and a jury decided that one of them was manipulating the situation,”. Leading sexual assault lawyer Debra Katz described the trial as having unique celebrity, "dysfunction", and "craziness" but judged that the Depp v. Heard verdict was less "consequential" to #MeToo compared to Harvey Weinstein losing his appeal for his rape conviction the next day. Tarana Burke, generally considered the founder of #MeToo, tweeted that "The 'me too' movement isn't dead, this system is dead [...]. When you get the verdict you want, 'the movement works' – when you don't, it's dead [...] This movement is very much alive." Jack Houghton, digital editor of Sky News Australia, deemed Vasquez's cross-examination to have showed the public Heard's lack of credibility while further considered the ruling of Waldman having defamed Heard to be "hardly a verdict that a cabal of sexist jurors would render".

Film adaptation 
A film adaptation of the trial, Hot Take: The Depp/Heard Trial, was premiered on September 30, 2022 on Tubi.

Post-trial motions

On July 1, 2022, Heard's legal team asked the court to set aside the verdict in favor of Depp in its entirety, dismiss the complaint or order a new trial. Their arguments included that (1) Heard "never edited or played any role with the respect to the headline" and "never even became aware of the headline until Mr. Depp filed the lawsuit against her"; (2) that "Depp’s award was excessive" and that, though Depp had "represented to the court he would limit his damages to the period Dec. 18, 2018 through Nov. 2, 2020," he "continued to urge the jury to restore his reputation and legacy to his children as a result of Ms. Heard accusing Mr. Depp in May 2016 of domestic violence"; (3) one juror was listed as born in 1945 in a court list, but public information "demonstrates that he appears to have been born in 1970".

On July 13, 2022, Azcarate denied several of Heard's post-trial motions for "reasons stated on the record" but provided further explanation regarding the disputed juror. She stated that the summons issued to the juror "listed his legal name and address and no birth date was noted", that the juror had provided his proper birth date when answering a court questionnaire and that Heard's legal team had neither alleged nor "shown evidence of prejudice" by the juror. She also noted that the parties had "questioned the jury panel for a full day and informed the court that the jury panel was acceptable"; and that "a party cannot wait until receiving an adverse verdict to object, for the first time, to an issue known since the beginning of trial." She concluded that "[t]he only evidence before this court is that this juror and all jurors followed their oaths, the court’s instructions and orders. This court is bound by the competent decision of the jury."

Appeals and settlement 
Heard appealed in October 2022 the judgment against her, while Depp appealed in November 2022 the judgment against him.

Heard and Depp settled the case in December 2022 and dropped their appeals, with Heard stating that even if her appeal had succeeded, she "simply cannot go through" a retrial having "lost faith in the American legal system". She maintained that the settlement was "not an act of concession" and that she had not agreed to any "restrictions or gags" going forward. Depp's lawyers stated that the "jury's unanimous decision and the resulting judgement in Mr. Depp's favor against Ms. Heard remain fully in place", and that the settlement would result in $1 million being paid to Depp by Heard's insurance, which "Depp is pledging and will donate to charities".

References

External links
 Op-ed written by Amber Heard for The Washington Post
 Fairfax County website: High-Profile Cases for Trial exhibits  and the list of documents made available by the Circuit Court. 
 YouTube playlists (with varying content) via: Law&Crime Network link and Sky News link

2022 in American law
2022 in Virginia
2022 in women's history
April 2022 events in the United States
May 2022 events in the United States
Domestic violence in the United States
United States defamation case law
2020s trials
Johnny Depp
The Washington Post
Legal history of Virginia
History of women in Virginia